Zarrillo is a surname. Notable people with the surname include:

Bonita Zarrillo (born 1965/66), Canadian politician
Bruno Zarrillo (born 1966), Italian-Canadian ice hockey player
Michele Zarrillo (born 1957), Italian singer-songwriter